A federated state (which may also be referred to as a state, a province, a region, a canton, a land, a governorate, an oblast, an emirate, or a country) is a territorial and constitutional community forming part of a federation. Such states differ from fully sovereign states, in that they do not have full sovereign powers, as the sovereign powers have been divided between the federated states and the central or federal government. Importantly, federated states do not have standing as entities of international law. Instead, the federal union as a single entity is the sovereign state for purposes of international law. Depending on the constitutional structure of a particular federation, a federated state can hold various degrees of legislative, judicial, and administrative jurisdiction over a defined geographic territory and is a form of regional government.

In some cases, a federation is created from the union of political entities that are either independent or dependent territories of another sovereign entity (most commonly a colonial power). In other cases, federated states have been created out of the administrative divisions of previously unitary states. Once a federal constitution is formed, the rules governing the relationship between federal and regional powers become part of the country's constitutional law and not international law.

In countries with federal constitutions, there is a division of power between the central government and the component states. These entities – states, provinces, counties, cantons, Länder, etc. - are partially self-governing and are afforded a degree of constitutionally guaranteed autonomy that varies substantially from one federation to another. Depending on the form the decentralization of powers takes, a federated state's legislative powers may or may not be overruled or vetoed by the federal government. Laws governing the relationship between federal and regional powers can be amended through the national or federal constitution, and, if they exist, state constitutions as well.

In terms of internal politics, federated states can have republican or monarchical forms of government. Those of republican form (federated republics) are usually called states (like states of the USA) or republics (like republics in the former USSR).

List of constituents by federation 
The "federated units" in the table below have inherent governmental authority in the federation's constitutional system, while the "other units" are delegated authority by the federal government or are administered directly by it.

See also 
 Associated state
 Federal district
 Federal territory
 Federation
 List of administrative divisions by country
 List of autonomous areas by country
 List of sovereign states
 Supranational union
 -stan

Notes

References 

Federalism
Types of administrative division
Federated states
Decentralization
Constitutional state types